4-Nitrotoluene or para-nitrotoluene is an organic compound with the formula CH3C6H4NO2. It is a pale yellow solid. It is one of three isomers of nitrotoluene.

Synthesis and reactions
Together with other isomers, 4-nitrotoluene is prepared by nitration of toluene, commonly using titanium(IV) nitrate. It undergoes the reactions typical for nitrobenzene derivatives, e.g. hydrogenation gives p-toluidine.

Oxidation of the methyl substituent of 4-nitrotoluene has been extensively investigated.  Depending on the conditions, oxidation yields 4-nitrobenzaldehyde diacetate, 4-nitrobenzenoic acid, and 4,4'-dinitrobibenzyl.  Treatment of 4-nitrotoluene with bromine gives the 4-nitrobenzyl bromide.

Applications
The principal application involves its sulfonation to give the 4-nitrotoluene-2-sulfonic acid (with the –SO3H group adjacent to methyl). This species can be oxidatively coupled to produce stilbene derivatives, which are used as dyes. Representative derivatives include the molecular and salt forms of 4,4'-dinitroso- and the 4,4'-dinitro-2,2'-stilbenedisulfonic acids, e.g. disodium 4,4'-dinitrostilbene-2,2'-disulfonate.

Safety
Evidence exists for toxicity and carcinogenicity in mice.

References

External links
CDC – NIOSH Pocket Guide to Chemical Hazards – p-Nitrotoluene

Nitrotoluenes